The Tour W, formerly the Tour Winterthur, is an office skyscraper in La Défense in the commune of Puteaux west of Paris, France.

The tower was designed by architects Delb, Chesnau, Verola and Lalande. At the time of its completion in 1973, the Tour Winterthur was the fourth highest building in La Défense. It was named after the Swiss insurance company Winterthur Group which owned the building until the end of the 1990s. It was later renamed to Tour W in 2013.

In 1996, renovation works started in the building. In 2019, French software development company Axway installed an illuminated sign atop the façade.

The building is located near La Défense station served by the Transilien, RER, Paris Metro and tram.

See also
List of tallest buildings and structures in the Paris region

References

Office buildings completed in 1973
Skyscraper office buildings in France
La Défense
20th-century architecture in France